Abrotanella submarginata is a member of the daisy family and is endemic species found in Chile (Magallanes).

References

submarginata